The Tyler City Hall at 212 N. Bonner Ave. in Tyler, Texas was built in 1938. It was designed by architect T. Shirley Simons, Sr.  It was listed on the National Register of Historic Places in 2007.

Construction of the building was financed by Depression-era PWA and/or WPA programs.  Simons had been hired in 1936 by the City of Tyler "to provide architectural services for publics works projects."  Other similar works by Simon were the Mother Frances Hospital and the new Tyler U.S. Post Office and Courthouse.  It has been termed "a good local rendering of Art Deco styling".

See also

National Register of Historic Places listings in Smith County, Texas

References

External links

City and town halls on the National Register of Historic Places in Texas
Neoclassical architecture in Texas
Government buildings completed in 1938
Buildings and structures in Tyler, Texas
City halls in Texas
National Register of Historic Places in Smith County, Texas